The District of Columbia Interscholastic Athletic Association (DCIAA) is the public high school athletic league in Washington, D.C. The league was founded in 1958. The original high school conference for D.C. schools was the Inter-High School Athletic Association, formed around 1896. That organization was segregated, and black schools in the District formed their own athletic association. The Inter-High League was renamed the DCIAA in 1989 to bring the District of Columbia in line with other states with interscholastic athletic programs.  The DCIAA offers sports on the elementary, middle and high school levels (grades 4th through 12th).

The DCIAA sponsors varsity championships in basketball, baseball, bowling, cheer, cross country, football, flag football, golf, lacrosse, soccer, softball, swimming, tennis, track and field, volleyball and wrestling.

Members

Football Divisions 
To increase the parity in DCIAA football, two separate divisions based on ability were created, rather than the East-West division structure of previous years. The Stars Division is the more competitive division, and those schools will be eligible for the historic Turkey Bowl game.

Stars Division
Roosevelt 
Ballou
Dunbar
Eastern
H.D. Woodson
Jackson-Reed

Stripes Division
Bell
Cardozo
Coolidge
McKinley Tech
Phelps
Anacostia
Ron Brown

In 2016-2017, Eastern moved up to the Stars Division while Coolidge goes to Stripes Division. 
In 2018-2019, Roosevelt moved up to the “Stars Division”.

Football Championships
The biggest and most-celebrated DCIAA sport, the football champion of the Stars Division is decided in the annual Turkey Bowl on Thanksgiving Day. Here is the history of the DCIAA football champions.

Baseball Championships
1991 - Bell
1992 - Bell
1993 - Wilson
1994 - Wilson
1995 - Wilson
1996 - Wilson
1997 - Wilson
1998 - Wilson
1999 - Wilson
2000 - Wilson
2001 - Wilson
2002 - Wilson
2003 - Wilson
2004 - Wilson
2005 - Wilson
2006 - Wilson
2007 - Wilson
2008 - Wilson
2009 - Wilson
2010 - Wilson
2011 - Wilson
2012 - Wilson
2013 - Wilson
2014 - Wilson
2015 - Wilson
2016 - Wilson
2017 - Wilson
2018 - Wilson
2019 - Wilson
2021 - Jackson-Reed (formerly known as Wilson)

Boys Basketball Championships
2020 - Roosevelt
2022 - Jackson-Reed (formerly known as Wilson)
2023 - Bard

Girls Basketball Championships 
2020 - Dunbar
2022 - Dunbar
2023 - Dunbar

Boys Cross Country Championships 

 2013 - Wilson
 2014 - Wilson
 2015 - Wilson
 2016 - Wilson
 2017 - Wilson
 2018 - Wilson
 2019 - Wilson
 2021 - Wilson
 2022 - Jackson-Reed (formerly known as Wilson)

Girls Cross Country Championships 

 2013 - Wilson
 2014 - Wilson
 2015 - Wilson
 2016 - Wilson
 2017 - Wilson
 2018 - Wilson
 2019 - Wilson
 2021 - Wilson
 2022 - Jackson-Reed (formerly known as Wilson)

Boys Indoor Track & Field Championships 

 2010 - Coolidge
 2011 - Dunbar
 2012 - Dunbar
 2015 - Wilson
 2016 - Wilson
 2017 - Wilson
 2018 - Wilson
 2019 - Wilson
 2023 - McKinley Tech

Girls Indoor Track & Field Championships 

 2010 - Dunbar
 2011 - Dunbar
 2012 - Dunbar
 2015 - McKinley Tech
 2016 - Wilson
 2017 - Wilson
 2018 - Wilson
 2019 - Dunbar
 2023 - Dunbar

Boys Outdoor Track & Field Championships 

 2005 - HD Woodson
 2007 - Dunbar
 2009 - Ballou
 2010 - Coolidge
 2011 - Dunbar
 2012 - Dunbar
 2013 - Dunbar
 2016 - Wilson
 2017 - Wilson
 2018 - McKinley Tech
 2019 - Wilson
 2022 - McKinley Tech

Girls Outdoor Track & Field Championships 

 2005 - Ballou
 2007 - Anacostia
 2009 - Dunbar
 2011 - Dunbar
 2012 - Dunbar
 2013 - Dunbar
 2016 - Wilson
 2017 - Wilson
 2018 - Dunbar
 2019 - Dunbar
 2022 - Jackson-Reed (formerly known as Wilson)

Former Schools
Spingarn High School-Closed in 2013
Western High School-Now Duke Ellington School of the Arts

Alumni

Baseball
Emmanuel Burriss, San Francisco Giants infielder (Wilson '02)
Maury Wills, former Major League Baseball shortstop/manager (Cardozo '51)

Basketball
Elgin Baylor, NBA Hall of Famer (Spingarn '53)
Dave Bing, NBA Hall of Famer (Spingarn '62)
Jerry Chambers, former NBA forward (Eastern '62)
Sherman Douglas, former NBA player (Spingarn '85)
Gene Littles, former NBA player and head coach (McKinley '61)
Ben Warley, former NBA player (Phelps '57)
Kermit Washington, former NBA player (Coolidge '70)

Football
Marvin Austin, Former NFL defensive tackle (Ballou '07)
Arrelious Benn, Philadelphia Eagles wide receiver/kick returner (Dunbar '07)
Willie J. Bennett, Jr., Former NCAA Football Coach/Current Assistant AD for DCIAA (H.D. Woodson '97)
Orlando Brown Sr., Former NFL Player (H.D Woodson)
Joshua Cribbs, Cleveland Browns wide receiver/kick returner (Dunbar '01)
Vernon Davis, San Francisco 49ers tight end (Dunbar '02)
Cato June, Indianapolis Colts linebacker (Anacostia '98)
Byron Leftwich, NFL quarterback (H.D. Woodson '98)
Josh Morgan, Washington Redskins wide receiver/kick returner (H.D. Woodson '04)
Lovell Pinkney, St. Louis Rams wide receiver (Anacostia '92)
Jerry Porter, Oakland Raiders wide receiver (Coolidge '97)
Larry Pinkard, NFL wide receiver (Ballou '10)
Reggie Rucker, former NFL wide receiver Dallas Cowboys, New York Giants, New England Patriots, Cleveland Browns (Anacostia '65)

See also
 NFHS

References

Education in Washington, D.C.
Sports organizations established in 1958
High school sports conferences and leagues in Washington, D.C.